(born 27 June 1962) is a Japanese fencer. He competed in the individual and team foil events at the 1984 Summer Olympics.

References

External links
 

1962 births
Living people
Japanese male foil fencers
Olympic fencers of Japan
Fencers at the 1984 Summer Olympics